Richard Lovett may refer to:

Richard Lovett (Seigneur), Seigneur of Upper Normandy
Richard Lovett (writer) (1851–1904), English Methodist minister and author
Richard A. Lovett (born 1953), science fiction author
Richard Lovett (scientist) (1692–1780), English amateur scientist